The Zion Lutheran Church is a church located in downtown Portland, Oregon, listed on the National Register of Historic Places. 

Architect Pietro Belluschi employed a number of innovations in this 1950 church, an example of the application of modern architectural principles to a religious building. Using local materials, influences, and artists and craftsmen, it represents the Northwest Regional style of modern architecture, which Belluschi (along with colleague John Yeon) originated and developed.  The low-relief angels in hammered copper on the sanctuary doors were designed by sculptor Frederic Littman.

See also
 National Register of Historic Places listings in Southwest Portland, Oregon

References

1950 establishments in Oregon
Churches completed in 1950
Churches in Portland, Oregon
Churches on the National Register of Historic Places in Oregon
Goose Hollow, Portland, Oregon
Lutheran churches in Oregon
Modern Movement architecture in the United States
National Register of Historic Places in Portland, Oregon
Pietro Belluschi buildings
Portland Historic Landmarks